Lord Buddha Koshi Medical College and Hospital is a medical college and hospital located in Saharsa, Bihar, India.
This college got an approval from MCI in 2019 for 100 MBBS Seat. College is located in between Saharsa - Madhepura National Highway 107.

Lord Buddha Koshi Medical College & Hospital, Saharsa was conceived by Lord Buddha Shiksha Pratisthan, a society (Buddhist Minority) registered under Society Registration Act 21 of 1860, Government of Bihar with registration number 033/2002-03

External links
Official website

Medical colleges in Bihar
Saharsa
Educational institutions in India with year of establishment missing